= 1964 Liechtenstein trade initiative referendum =

- 20 December 1964
- Referendum on a trade initiative

Results
Choice	Votes	%
Yes	1,131	37.55%
No	1,881	62.45%
Valid votes	3,012	95.32%
Invalid or blank votes	148	4.68%
Total votes	3,160	100.00%
Registered voters/turnout	3,809	82.96%

A referendum on a trade initiative was held in Liechtenstein on 20 December 1964. The proposal was rejected by 62.5% of voters.

== Results ==
Choice	Votes	%
For	1,131	37.5
Against	1,881	62.5
Invalid/blank votes	148	–
Total	3,160	100
Registered voters/turnout	3,809	83.0
Source: Nohlen & Stöver
